John Gladstone Graney (June 10, 1886 – April 20, 1978) was a Canadian professional baseball left fielder. He played in Major League Baseball for 14 seasons, all with the Cleveland Indians franchise. In his 1402-game career, Graney batted .250 (1178-for-4705) with 706 runs, 18 home runs and 420 RBI.

Following his playing days, Graney became a baseball radio broadcaster, providing play-by-play for the Indians from 1932 to 1953. He was inducted into the Cleveland Indians Distinguished Hall of Fame for non-uniformed personnel on August 11, 2012, prior to a game at Progressive Field. He won the 2022 Ford C. Frick Award.

Playing career

Graney began his professional baseball career as a pitcher, and remained one through the 1909 season. He pitched in two games for the Naps in 1908, and spent the rest of 1908 and 1909 with the Portland Beavers. When he was brought back up to the Naps roster in 1910, they converted him to an outfielder, as Naps management did not trust his control at the major league level.

Graney was the first batter to face Babe Ruth in a Major League Baseball game, on July 11, 1914. Graney led the American League with 41 doubles in 1916, scoring a career-high 106 runs. He led the league in walks in both 1917 and 1919.

On August 17, 1920, Indians shortstop Ray Chapman, Graney's roommate and best friend, died after being struck in the head by a Carl Mays pitch the day before. Graney was devastated, suffering a breakdown upon viewing Chapman's body, having to be forcibly removed from the hospital room. Two days later during the casket viewing, Graney fainted. He was too distraught to attend the funeral and never forgave Mays for what he believed was an intentional beaning. The Indians went on to win the pennant and 1920 World Series against Brooklyn, with Graney going hitless in his only three postseason at-bats.

Broadcasting 
After retiring from playing, Graney became a play-by-play broadcaster for the team, thus being the first former Major League Baseball player to become a radio broadcaster in the United States. Graney’s partner in the radio booth was Jimmy Dudley.

Graney died at age 91 in Louisiana, Missouri on Thursday, April 20, 1978.

Legacy
In 1987 the Canadian Baseball Hall of Fame instituted an award in the name of Jack Graney, presented periodically to journalists deemed to have made notable contributions to promoting baseball within Canada in their lifetime.

Graney was inducted into the Canadian Baseball Hall of Fame in 1984, its second year of operation. In the 2022 Baseball Hall of Fame balloting, he won the Ford C. Frick Award.

See also
List of Major League Baseball players from Canada
List of Major League Baseball annual doubles leaders
List of Major League Baseball players who spent their entire career with one franchise

References

External links

1886 births
1978 deaths
Baseball people from Ontario
Canadian Baseball Hall of Fame inductees
Canadian expatriate baseball players in the United States
Cleveland Indians announcers
Cleveland Indians players
Cleveland Naps players
Des Moines Boosters players
Major League Baseball broadcasters
Major League Baseball left fielders
Major League Baseball players from Canada
People from St. Thomas, Ontario
Minor league baseball managers
St. Thomas Saints players
Fulton (minor league baseball) players
Wilkes-Barre Barons (baseball) players
Portland Beavers players
Ford C. Frick Award recipients